The men's bantamweight event was part of the boxing programme at the 1924 Summer Olympics. The weight class was the second-lightest contested, and allowed boxers of up to 118 pounds (53.5 kilograms). The competition was held from July 15, 1924, to July 20, 1924. 21 boxers from 15 nations competed.

In their round of 16 bout, Joseph Lazarus knocked out Oscar Andrén, but was disqualified for hitting Andrén in a clinch a few seconds before the knockout punch.

Results

References

Sources
 official report
 

Bantamweight